The Broken Hill miners' strike of 1919–20 was fought over safety conditions in the mines and eventually resulted in the Holman ministry (1916–1920) setting up a royal commission into the mining industry at Broken Hill.

References

1919 labor disputes and strikes
1920 labor disputes and strikes
Miners' labour disputes in Australia
1919 in Australia
1920 in Australia